Flying Tiger Line Flight 45 was a regularly scheduled cargo flight by Flying Tiger Line from Los Angeles to Da Nang Air Base in South Vietnam, with intermediate stops at San Francisco, Seattle, Cold Bay, Tokyo, Naha, Hong Kong, and Cam Ranh. On July 27, 1970, the flight, a Douglas DC-8-63F with the registration N785FT crashed on final approach as it was trying to make its 4th stopover at Naha Airport (then Naha Air Base) in Okinawa, which was under US administration at the time.

Overview 
The aircraft involved in the incident was a Douglas DC 8-63F with the registration number N785FT and serial number 46009, and powered by four Pratt & Whitney JT3D-7 engines. The aircraft was delivered to Flying Tiger Line on November 19, 1968. At the time of the incident, the aircraft had accumulated a total of 6047.2 hours. The aircraft took off from Los Angeles International Airport at 20:53PM on July 25 and after 3 scheduled stops arrived at Haneda Airport at 22:44PM on July 26. The aircraft and crew stayed over at Tokyo for the night before taking off on 9:29AM for Naha Air Base.

The aircraft was making its final approach to Naha Air Base's Runway 18 using precision radar approach at around 11:35AM when the aircraft's rate of descent increased and subsequently crashed 2,000 feet short of the runway. All four crew members did not survive the crash.

Cause 
Flying Tiger Line Flight 45 flew from Tokyo to Naha using IFR, and crashed on final approach just as it had passed a low level raincloud.

The investigation by the National Transportation Safety Board concludes that the aircraft encountered a tropical storm while on approach with visibility not reaching 1 mile, only for visibility to increase by 10 to a 100 times once the clouds cleared, blinding the piloting crews and making the approach difficult.

References 

Accidents and incidents involving the Douglas DC-8
Aviation accidents and incidents in 1970
Flying Tiger Line accidents and incidents
July 1970 events in Asia
Okinawa under United States occupation